The commune of Ngozi is a commune of Ngozi Province in northern Burundi. The capital lies at Ngozi.

References

Communes of Burundi
Ngozi Province